The Egypt women's national football team represents Egypt in international women's football. It is governed by the Egyptian Football Association.

Like most African Nations, women's football in Egypt has lacked development, whereas the men's team is one of the continent's most traditional.

History

The beginning
The team had an agonizing start. As shown when they were lost 17–0 by Russia in a 1993 unofficial friendly. An unimpressed correspondent in the Egyptian Mail newspaper wrote of the players:

After some development, the Cleopatra's were able to make their official debut in the 1998 African Championship after beating Uganda in the qualifying round. They lost all 3 matches with horrible results but were able to score 2 goals.

In 2012 they made their fourth appearance in the African Championship's qualifiers. They were knocked out by Ethiopia.

Egypt was able to qualify to the 2016 Tournament after beating Ivory Coast on Away Goals rule. This was considered an upset since the Ivory Coast had recently played at the World Cup.

In the tournament, Egypt lost 2–0 to Cameroon and 5–0 to South Africa but were able to snatch their first victory against Zimbabwe after a sole goal by Tarik.

Egypt did not enter the qualification rounds to the 2019 World Cup nor the African Women's Cup. They have not played a friendly in over a year and are currently unranked.

Team image

Nicknames
The Egypt women's national football team has been known or nicknamed as the "Cleopatras".

Home stadium
Egypt plays their home matches on the Cairo International Stadium.

Overall competitive record

Results and fixtures
 
 

The following is a list of match results in the last 12 months, as well as any future matches that have been scheduled.

Legend

2022

2023

All-time results
 The following table shows Egypt's all-time international record, correct as of 1 June 2018.

Source: Worldfootball – 2005 to 2017 : 48 , 21 , 7 , 20 , 93–65 , +28, FIFA – 1998 to 2017
1998 : 5 , 1 , 1 , 3 , 4–15 , −11
2000 : 2 , 0 , 1 , 1 , 4–5 , −1
2006 Arab Women's Championship
2010 Arabia Women's Cup

Coaching staff

Current coaching staff
:

Manager history

 (20xx–present) Mohamed Mostafa Abdelhamid

Players

Current squad
The following players were called up for the Friendly match's against   on 19 and 22 February 2023. 
Caps and goals accurate up to and including 26 August 2021.

Recent call-ups
The following players have been called up to the Egypt squad in the past 12 months.

INJ Player withdrew from the squad due to an injury.
PRE Preliminary squad.
SUS Player is serving a suspension.
WD Player withdrew for personal reasons.

Previous squads
Africa Women Cup of Nations

2016 Africa Women Cup of Nations squad

Competitive record

FIFA Women's World Cup

*Draws include knockout matches decided on penalty kicks.

Olympic Games

*Draws include knockout matches decided on penalty kicks.

Africa Women Cup of Nations

UNAF Women's Tournament

Arab Women's Championship

Head-to-head record

See also

 Sport in Egypt
 Football in Egypt
 Women's football in Egypt
 Muslim women in sport
 Women's association football
 Egypt national football team
Egypt women's national under-20 football team
Egypt women's national under-17 football team

References

External links
Official website
FIFA profile

َArabic women's national association football teams
 
African women's national association football teams